ONCE cycling team, also known as Liberty Seguros, Liberty Seguros–Würth and in succession in its final year, Astana–Würth and Astana was a Spanish cycling team. It competed in the UCI ProTour circuit.

On 25 May 2006, Liberty Mutual ("seguros" means "insurance" in Spanish) pulled out of primary sponsorship due to a doping scandal involving the directeur sportif, Manolo Saiz. On 2 June 2006, the team acquired a primary sponsor named Astana, after the capital of Kazakhstan. Würth was co-sponsor until 3 July 2006, withdrawing at the end of the 2006 Tour de France, in which  didn't compete  . At the end of the season, Astana also withdrew due to the non-participation in the Tour. On 16 December 2006, the UCI withdrew the ProTour licence of Saiz's company, Active Bay .

Some riders and staff formed the Kazakhstan-based Astana Team.

History

ONCE
The team traces its lineage to the Spanish team, ONCE, sponsored by a lottery for the blind.  Manolo Saiz, one of few managers who was not a former rider, introduced more professional management, closer supervision in coaching, equipment and training. In the 2003 Vuelta he was banned from the race after insulting a motorcycle-mounted TV cameraman, his comments broadcast live.

ONCE team was known for its association with Laurent Jalabert and Alex Zülle in the 1990s, dominating spring races such as Paris–Nice, La Flèche Wallonne and the Tour de Romandie. The team won the Vuelta a España in 1995, 1996 and 1997. It dominated the 1995 Vuelta with Jalabert winning overall, the points competition and the mountains. It was also best team, with Johan Bruyneel third. ONCE team in the Tour de France had stage wins from Jalabert and domination in the team time trial.

Zülle won the Vuelta in 1996 and 1997 but left the team in 1998. The team signed the 1998 winner and individual time trial specialist, Abraham Olano, who challenged in the 1999 Vuelta but never won a second Grand Tour. Joseba Beloki became leader and challenged Armstrong in the 2002 and 2003 Tours.

Isidro Nozal led the 2003 Vuelta until Roberto Heras took the lead on the penultimate day. ONCE's sponsorship was so successful that brand penetration was 100% in Spain, meaning every Spaniard surveyed knew ONCE.  At the end of 2003 ONCE stopped sponsorship. Saiz obtained a new sponsor, Liberty Mutual. Most of the riders stayed, including Isidro Nozal and Igor González de Galdeano. Saiz signed Heras; he did not perform well at the 2004 Tour de France but won the 2004 Vuelta after a battle with Santiago Pérez.

Liberty Seguros
In the 2005 the team started with wins in the Tour Down Under through Alberto Contador and Luis León Sánchez.  In the 2005 Tour the team won the stage to Mende courtesy of Marcos Antonio Serrano, reminiscent of Laurent Jalabert's win in 1995.

Alexander Vinokourov joined in 2006 for three seasons to challenge for top finish in the Tour de France.  Fellow Kazakhstan riders Andrei Kashechkin, formerly of Crédit Agricole, and Sergei Yakovlev also joined.

On 25 November, Roberto Heras was fired after a urine sample from the 2005 Vuelta a España, which he had won, tested positive for the blood-boosting drug EPO. Heras was stripped of what would have been a record-breaking fourth win and banned for two years.

Sponsorship Changes and 2006 Season
On 23 May 2006, Saiz was arrested in relation to the Operación Puerto blood doping scandal. Liberty Mutual retracted sponsorship on 25 May 2006, promising only to finance current obligations. On 2 June 2006, the team acquired a new primary sponsor – named Astana, the capital of Kazakhstan – for three years, with an option to extend to six. It was headed by a consortium of five Kazakh companies. Long before Saiz was ensnared in Operación Puerto, the team had been notorious for doping dating back to its days as ONCE, and was considered one of the dirtiest teams in the European peloton.

On June 30, 2006, Astana-Würth was excluded from the 2006 Tour de France after five riders were implicated in a doping scandal, leaving Vinokourov with three remaining teammates, below the minimum six for the Tour. Würth stopped its commitment on 3 of July.

On 26 July 2006, the five riders excluded from the Tour were cleared by Spanish officials, and the team returned to competition at the Tour of Germany in August, Assan Bazayev winning the first stage. One rider, Joseba Beloki, would never ride a professional race again.

At the end of 2006, Saiz listed Astana as his team's backer. Astana also claimed to have withdrawn support due to non-participation in the Tour. On 16 December 2006, the UCI withdrew the ProTour license of Saiz's Active Bay company.

Victories in the later years of the team's existence

2002 results

2003 results

2004 results

2005 results

2006 results

Notable riders

References

External links

Defunct cycling teams based in Spain
Cycling teams established in 1989
Cycling teams disestablished in 2006
Former UCI WorldTeams